The Church of St Peter and St Paul, Hucknall is a parish church in the Church of England in the Westville suburb of Hucknall, Nottinghamshire.

History
The church was built in 1956 and further extended in 1985. It is a hexagonal shaped building. It has a total immersion baptistery.

Current parish status
It is in a group of parishes which includes:
Church of St John the Evangelist, Butler's Hill
Church of St Mary Magdalene, Hucknall
Church of St Peter and St Paul

Sources

Hucknall
Churches completed in 1956
20th-century Church of England church buildings